Cataclysta pusillalis is a Crambidae moth species in the genus Cataclysta. It was described by Saalmüller, in 1880, and is known from Madagascar.

This species has a wingspan of 11 mm.

References

Moths described in 1880
Acentropinae
Moths of Madagascar
Moths of Africa